The Goya Award for Best Supporting Actor is an award presented annually by the Academy of Cinematographic Arts and Sciences of Spain. It is given in honor of an actor who has delivered an outstanding supporting performance in a film.

Miguel Rellán was the first winner of this category for his performance in Dear Nanny. Actors Juan Diego, Eduard Fernández, Karra Elejalde, Emilio Gutiérrez Caba and Luis Zahera hold the record for most wins in this category with two victories each while Antonio de la Torre, Juan Diego and Eduard Fernández have received the most nominations for this award with six each.

Winners and nominees

1980s

1990s

2000s

2010s

2020s

Superlatives

Actors with more than 1 award in the category
2 wins: Juan Diego, 6 nominations
2 wins: Eduard Fernández, 6 nominations
2 wins: Karra Elejalde, 3 nominations
2 wins: Emilio Gutiérrez Caba, 3 nominations
2 wins: Luis Zahera, 2 nominations

Actors with more than 1 nomination in the category
6 nominations: Antonio de la Torre
6 nominations: Juan Diego
6 nominations: Eduard Fernández
5 nominations: Juan Echanove
4 nominations: Agustín González
3 nominations: Raúl Arévalo
3 nominations: Karra Elejalde
3 nominations: José Luis Gómez
3 nominations: Emilio Gutiérrez Caba
3 nominations: Juan Diego Botto
3 nominations: Manolo Solo
2 nominations: Álex Angulo
2 nominations: Carlos Bardem
2 nominations: Celso Bugallo
2 nominations: Javier Cámara
2 nominations: José Coronado
2 nominations: Luis Cuenca
2 nominations: Gabino Diego
2 nominations: Fernando Guillén
2 nominations: Javier Gurruchaga
2 nominations: Sergi López
2 nominations: Enrique San Francisco
2 nominations: Alberto San Juan
2 nominations: Jorge Sanz
2 nominations: Leonardo Sbaraglia
2 nominations: Julián Villagrán
2 nominations: Luis Zahera
2 nominations: Fernando Tejero

References

External links
Official site
IMDb: Goya Awards

Supporting Actor
Film awards for supporting actor